Sankei Hall was a multi-purpose auditorium located in Ōtemachi, Tokyo, Japan. Notable past performers include Cannonball Adderley, John Coltrane, B.B. King, Milva, The Beach Boys and Free.

References

Music venues in Tokyo
Buildings and structures in Chiyoda, Tokyo
Former music venues